Salisbury Mall can refer to:

Salisbury Mall (Maryland), a former mall in Salisbury, Maryland
Salisbury Mall (North Carolina) in Salisbury, North Carolina